Alexander James Jackson (born 28 November 1935) is a Scottish former professional footballer who played in the Football League for Birmingham City and Plymouth Argyle. He played primarily as a centre forward, but Plymouth also used him as an inside forward.

Career
Jackson was born in Glasgow where he grew up with Sisters Jean and Shirley, and brother Jim. He joined Birmingham City from junior club Shettleston for a fee of £2,000 in April 1958. He made his debut in the First Division on 15 November 1958, deputising for Eddy Brown in a home game against Newcastle United which Birmingham won 1–0. Jackson had a run of five games at centre forward a few weeks later, but despite scoring six goals in those five games, his first-team football was restricted to the FA Cup thereafter, and new arrival Robin Stubbs stepped into the league side.

In March 1960, having played no first-team football for a year, Jackson joined Plymouth Argyle. In four seasons, he scored 27 goals from 75 appearances in all competitions, though he suffered a broken leg in 1963, after which his form deteriorated. He moved into non-league football with Weymouth in 1964, stayed at the club for six seasons, scored 61 goals in all competitions, and was awarded a share of two benefit matches.

References

1935 births
Living people
Footballers from Glasgow
Scottish footballers
Association football forwards
Birmingham City F.C. players
Plymouth Argyle F.C. players
Weymouth F.C. players
Scottish Junior Football Association players
English Football League players
Southern Football League players
Glasgow United F.C. players